List of rivers flowing in the island of Sumatra, Indonesia.

In alphabetical order

Mouth location

North coast

Northeast coast

Northwest coast

West coast

East coast

Southeast coast

By Province

Aceh

Jambi

Lampung

North Sumatra

Riau

South Sumatra

West Sumatra

See also
 List of rivers of Indonesia

References

Sources
 W. van Gelder. Dari Tanah Hindia berkoeliling boemi: kitab pengadjaran ilmoe boemi bagi sekola anak negeri di Hindia-Nederland. J.B. Wolters, 1897.Original from National Library of the Netherlands (original from Leiden University Libraries). Digitized: Nov 5, 2017.
 Wetenschappelijke voordrachten gehouden te Amsterdam in 1883, ter gelegenheid der Koloniale Tentoonstelling. Amsterdam (Netherlands). Koloniale Tentoonstelling, 1883. Uitgegeven door de Vijfde Afdeeling van het Tentoonstellings-bestuur, E. J. Brill, 1884. Cornell University. Digitized: May 22, 2014.

 
Sumatra